Torre Orsaia (Cilentan: La Turri) is a town and comune in the province of Salerno in the Campania region of south-western Italy.

History
The settlement, originally named Turris Ursajae, was founded in the 11th century, in the current location of the nearby village of Castel Ruggero.

Geography
The municipality, located in southern Cilento and included in the Cilento and Vallo di Diano National Park, borders with Caselle in Pittari, Morigerati, Roccagloriosa, Rofrano, San Giovanni a Piro and Santa Marina. It counts the hamlets (frazioni) of Borgo Cerreto (shared with Rofrano), Calleo and Castel Ruggero (autonomous municipality until 1929).

Main sights
The medieval town is situated on a green hill in the middle of centuries old Pisciotta olive trees. The stone fountains "dell’Olmo" and "della Scalitta" which are situated just outside the town are witnesses of the local craft industry.

Transport
The town is crossed in the middle by the national highway SS 18 and is served by an exit, "Torre Orsaia", on the SS 517/var highway Padula-Policastro, that is 7.6 km far. Torre Orsaia station, located in the village of Calleo and part of the Naples-Salerno-Reggio Calabria railway, is 6.4 km from the town.

Personalities
Carmine Tripodi (1960-1985), carabinier, victim of the 'Ndrangeta

See also
Cilentan dialect

References

External links

 Official website 
 Office of Tourism of Torre Orsaia 
  Torre Orsaia on tuttaitalia.it 

Cities and towns in Campania
Localities of Cilento